The 1980 Indian general election in Tamil Nadu saw elections for all 39 Lok Sabha seats in the state. The result was a landslide victory for the Indian National Congress (Indira) and its ally Dravida Munnetra Kazhagam, who won 37 out of 39 seats. Many observers considered it an upset defeat for the ruling state party, All India Anna Dravida Munnetra Kazhagam, and its general secretary M. G. Ramachandran, which only won 2 seats—Gobichettipalayam and Sivakasi. Prior to the election, INC leader Indira Gandhi had formed an alliance with the DMK, resulting in an important part of her victory in the nationwide election that returned her to the office of Prime Minister of India.

Voting and results

Results by Alliance

 The All India Anna Dravida Munnetra Kazhagam was part of an alliance with Indira Congress in 1977, while the DMK is in alliance with them for the 1980 election

List of Elected MPs

Post-election Union Council of Ministers from Tamil Nadu

Cabinet Ministers

See also 
Elections in Tamil Nadu

References

Bibliography 
Volume I, 1980 Indian general election, 7th Lok Sabha

External links
 Website of Election Commission of India
 CNN-IBN Lok Sabha Election History

1980 Indian general election
Indian general elections in Tamil Nadu
1980s in Tamil Nadu